Drahomíra Vihanová (31 July 1930 – 10 December 2017) was a Czech film director, documentarian, and screenwriter.

Life
Vihanová was born in Moravský Krumlov. Her debut work was a 1965 short film named Fugue on the Black Keys. Her 1969 debut feature film Squandered Sunday was banned before release, and Vihanová was restricted to work on documentaries and television until the transition to democracy in 1989.

Vihanová died after a short illness at the age of 87.

Filmography
Singing that Did Not Die Out (1962)
The Black Keys Fugue (1964)
A Squandered Sunday (1969)
Questions for Two Women (1985)
Pevnost (1994) 
The Pilgrimage of Students Peter and Jacob (2000)

References

1930 births
2017 deaths
People from Moravský Krumlov
Academy of Performing Arts in Prague alumni
Czech women film directors
Czech screenwriters
Czech women screenwriters